The Sun Blade series is a computer workstation line based on the UltraSPARC microprocessor family, developed and sold by Sun Microsystems from 2000 to 2006. The range replaced the earlier Sun Ultra workstation series.

The Sun Blade 1000, introduced in October 2000, was the first system to use Fireplane as the interconnect between its single or dual processors and the I/O subsystem, a few months ahead of its use in the new Sun Fire server product line.

The 1500/2500 series came in two variants, the earlier "red" series, and the later "silver" series. The "silver" series were enhanced versions of the "red" series - a faster CPU being the key differentiator.

The Sun Blade series was supplanted by the Sun Java Workstation line in 2004.

The product line's name was not a reference to "blade server" systems, a term not yet in common use in 2000.  In 2006, Sun did introduce an unrelated "Sun Blade" blade server product line.

Models

External links

Oracle Legacy Product Documentation: Workstations
Sun System Handbook, v2.1

Sun workstations
SPARC microprocessor products